The Dymaxion Chronofile is Buckminster Fuller's attempt to document his life as completely as possible. He created a very large scrapbook in which he documented his life every 15 minutes from 1920 to 1983. The scrapbook contains copies of all correspondence, bills, notes, sketches, and clippings from newspapers. The total collection is estimated to be 270 feet (80 m) worth of paper. This is said to be the most documented human life in history.

Fuller's Chronofile contains over 140,000 pieces of paper, as well as 64,000 feet of film, 1,500 hours of audio tape, and 300 hours of video recordings. The Chronofile is cross-referenced alphabetically using 13,500 5x8 inch index cards. Photos from Fuller's childhood from age four were added retrospectively.

At a low point in his life at age 32, when considering suicide, Fuller reviewed his Chronofile to that date and concluded that he had been most effective when his efforts were on the behalf of others and resolved to focus his future work toward "all humanity".

Fuller's Dymaxion Chronofile inspired William McDonough to participate in his own "Living Archive".

See also 
 Dymaxion car
 Dymaxion house
 Dymaxion map
 Lifelog
 MyLifeBits

References

External links 
 Stanford University Library - R. Buckminster Fuller Archive

Books by Buckminster Fuller
Diaries